Bethlehem Chapel, Richmond is an independent Calvinistic chapel on the east side of Church Terrace in Richmond, London. Built in 1797, the small one-storey stuccoed building is Grade II* listed. It still has its original galleried interior with pews and pulpit.

History
The church was built by John Chapman, who was a market gardener in Petersham. It was funded by subscription and is known as a "Huntington Chapel" as it was opened by Calvinist preacher William Huntington who founded or opened chapels throughout England, many of which have survived.

Hansard records a petition to the House of Lords on 14 May 1846 by "Thomas William Dawson, on behalf of the Church and Congregation of Protestant Dissenters of Bethlehem Chapel, Richmond, in favour of the Charitable Trusts Bill".

Services and other activities
The church is traditional in worship and doctrine and uses the Authorised King James Version of the Bible.  Services are held on Sunday mornings at 11:00 am. There are prayer and Bible study sessions on Thursday evenings at 8:00 pm.

Richmond Messianic Fellowship meets at Bethlehem Chapel on the second and on the last Friday of each month.

References

External links

Official website

1797 establishments in England
18th-century churches in the United Kingdom
Churches completed in 1797
Churches in the London Borough of Richmond upon Thames
Evangelical churches in London
Grade II* listed churches in the London Borough of Richmond upon Thames
18th-century Calvinist and Reformed churches
Richmond, London